Trevor Stanley Breusch (born c. 1953) is an Australian econometrician and was until his retirement Professor of Econometrics and Deputy Director of Crawford School of Public Policy at the Australian National University. He is noted for the Breusch–Pagan test from the paper (with Adrian Pagan) "A simple test for heteroscedasticity and random coefficient variation" (see Noted works, below). Another contribution to econometrics is the serial correlation Lagrange multiplier test, often called Breusch–Godfrey test after Breusch and Leslie G. Godfrey, which can be used to identify autocorrelation in the errors of a regression model.

Awards 
 Australian Finance Conference Prize in Economics, University of Queensland, 1973.
 University of Queensland Medal, 1975.
 Fellow of the Econometric Society, 1991.

Noted works

External links 
Staff page

1950s births
Living people
Econometricians
Australian economists
Australian National University alumni
Fellows of the Econometric Society